The 2015 CONCACAF Champions League Final was the final of the 2014–15 CONCACAF Champions League, the 7th edition of the CONCACAF Champions League under its current format, and overall the 50th edition of the premium football club competition organized by CONCACAF, the regional governing body of North America, Central America, and the Caribbean.

The final was contested in two-legged home-and-away format between Mexican team América and Canadian team Montreal Impact. The first leg was hosted by América at Estadio Azteca in Mexico City on April 22, 2015, while the second leg was hosted by the Montreal Impact at Olympic Stadium in Montreal on April 29, 2015. The winner earned the right to represent CONCACAF at the 2015 FIFA Club World Cup, entering at the quarterfinal stage.

After a 1–1 first leg, América won the second leg 4–2 to win their sixth overall CONCACAF club title.

Background
For only the second time in seven seasons of the CONCACAF Champions League, the final featured a non-Mexican team, with the only previous occasion where it was not an all-Mexican final being in 2011, where Real Salt Lake lost to Monterrey.

This was the first final of América in the CONCACAF Champions League era, but they had won the CONCACAF Champions' Cup title five times (1977, 1987, 1990, 1992, 2006). They were aiming to equal Cruz Azul's record of six CONCACAF club titles which was set in last year's final.

Montreal Impact was the first Canadian team to reach a CONCACAF club final. They were aiming to become the first non-Mexican team to win in the CONCACAF Champions League era, and the third Major League Soccer team to win the CONCACAF club title after D.C. United (1998) and LA Galaxy (2000).

Road to the final

Note: In all results below, the score of the finalist is given first (H: home; A: away).

Rules
The final was played on a home-and-away two-legged basis. The away goals rule would be used if the aggregate score was level after normal time of the second leg, but not after extra time, and so the final would be decided by penalty shoot-out if the aggregate score was level after extra time of the second leg.

Matches

First leg
Montreal Impact took the lead in the 16th minute after Ignacio Piatti received a pass from Dominic Oduro to shoot home inside the penalty area. América equalized in the 89th minute, as half-time substitute Oribe Peralta, who was subbed on for Martinez, headed in Rubens Sambueza's free kick. Shortly after the equalizer, Montreal goalkeeper Evan Bush was shown a yellow card for kicking the ball Paul Aguilar, however, replays show that Aguilar jumped in front of the ball as Bush was kicking it away. Aguilar then proceeded to punch Bush in the face, which went unpunished.  This yellow card was crucial, as it suspended Bush for the second leg of the final.

Second leg
Montreal Impact took the lead in the 8th minute, after Andrés Romero received Ignacio Piatti's pass, dribbled on goal and scored. Darío Benedetto had a golden chance just a few minutes later when he had a seemingly open goal from 4 yards out, but his shot hit the crossbar and the Impact cleared the ball away.  Piatti had a great chance to extend the lead for Montreal midway through the first half, but Moisés Muñoz made a great save for Club America. The lead lasted until the 50th minute, as Darío Benedetto equalized for América with a scissor kick from Osvaldo Martínez's cross. América took the lead in the 65th minute, when Darwin Quintero headed the ball across goal for Oribe Peralta to head it in. Benedetto increased América's lead two minutes later as he stabbed in a cross from Miguel Samudio, and completed his hat-trick in the 81st minute with a curling shot after another assist from Quintero. Jack McInerney added a consolation goal in the 88th minute as he scored from Piatti's pass.

References

External links
CONCACAF Champions League , CONCACAF.com

Finals
Club América matches
CF Montréal matches
2014–15 in Mexican football
2015 in Canadian soccer
2015 in Quebec
International club association football competitions hosted by Mexico
CONCACAF Champions League finals